U.S. Route 412 (US 412) enters the state of Missouri from Arkansas near Cardwell. The highway leaves the state into Tennessee concurrent with I-155 near Caruthersville.

Route description

US 412 enters the state from Arkansas after crossing the St. Francis River. The highway enters into the small town of Cardwell before turning to the north. In Kennett, the highway turns back to the east, concurrent with Route 84. In Hayti, US 412 has an interchange with I-55 and travels concurrent with I-155. The two highways cross the Mississippi River on the Caruthersville Bridge into Tennessee.

Major intersections

See also

References

External links

12-4
Transportation in Dunklin County, Missouri
Transportation in Pemiscot County, Missouri
 Missouri